Flèche or Fleche may refer to:
Flèche (architecture), a type of church spire
Flèche (cycling), a team cycling competition
Flèche (fencing), an aggressive offensive fencing technique
Flèche (fortification), a defensive work
, ships of the Royal Navy

See also
Lafleche (disambiguation)